Valmont Industries, Inc. is a global leader in the design, manufacturing, and distribution of engineered products and services for infrastructure and irrigation equipment. With a history dating back to 1946, Valmont has become one of the most trusted names in the industry. The company operates through a network of manufacturing facilities, distribution centers, and service centers located in North America, Europe, and Asia.

History

Valmont Industries was founded in 1946 by Robert B. Daugherty in Valley, Nebraska. The company started as a small metal fabrication business and has grown over the years to become a global leader in the infrastructure and irrigation equipment industry. In the 1960s and 1970s, Valmont expanded its product offerings to include irrigation systems and began serving customers in the agricultural sector. Today, the company serves a wide range of customers in various industries including utility, transportation, and energy. The company name comes from a combination of the names of two nearby towns, Fremont and Valley.

Products and Services

Valmont Industries offers a wide range of products and services for infrastructure and irrigation equipment. The company's infrastructure products include utility structures such as poles, towers, and substation structures for the electric power and communication industries. The company also offers a range of lighting products for roads, highways, and other public spaces.

Valmont's irrigation products include center pivot and linear irrigation systems for agriculture, as well as land leveling and drainage solutions. The company also offers a range of water management services including water measurement and control, water management consulting, and custom-engineered systems.

In addition to its core products, Valmont Industries provides a range of value-added services such as engineering, design, fabrication, and installation. The company's in-house engineers and technicians use the latest technology and equipment to provide custom-engineered solutions for customers.

Corporate Social Responsibility

Valmont Industries is committed to corporate social responsibility and sustainability. The company has a comprehensive sustainability program that includes initiatives in energy and water conservation, waste reduction, and the responsible sourcing of materials. The company also actively supports local communities through charitable donations, volunteer work, and other initiatives.

Conclusion

Valmont Industries is a global leader in the design, manufacturing, and distribution of engineered products and services for infrastructure and irrigation equipment. With a commitment to quality, innovation, and sustainability, the company has established a reputation as one of the most trusted names in the industry. Valmont's broad range of products and services, combined with its highly skilled employees and cutting-edge technology, makes it a partner that customers can rely on for all their infrastructure and irrigation needs.

See also
Wind power in Nebraska

References

External links
Valmont Industries
Valley Irrigation
Valmont Coatings

Irrigation companies
Companies based in Omaha, Nebraska
Companies listed on the New York Stock Exchange
Manufacturing companies based in Nebraska
Wind power in Nebraska